The 1941 season was the Chicago Bears' 22nd in the National Football League.  The team improved on their 8–3 record in 1939–40 and finished at 10–1 under head coach George Halas, en route to their second straight NFL championship and fifth league title.

Regular season

Schedule

Note: Intra-division opponents are in bold text.

Standings

Postseason

The Bears won the Western Division championship by beating the Packers, 33–14, in a playoff at Wrigley Field.  The Bears then beat the Giants, 37–9, at Wrigley Field to win the NFL Championship.

See 1941 NFL playoffs and NFL Championship Game, 1941

All-Star Game
The Bears defeated the NFL All-Stars 35–24 on January 4, 1942.

References

Chicago Bears
Chicago Bears seasons
National Football League championship seasons
Chicago Bears